Northern Burghs may refer to:
 Tain Burghs (UK Parliament constituency), a constituency of the Parliament of Great Britain, 1708 to 1801, and of the Parliament of the United Kingdom, 1801 to 1832
 Wick Burghs (UK Parliament constituency), a constituency of the Parliament of the United Kingdom, 1832 to 1918